Tea Pets, also released as Toys & Pets, is a 2017 Chinese 3D computer-animated comedy film written and directed by Gary Wang, and produced by Yuan Ye and Yu Zhou. It was produced by Wang's studio Light Chaser Animation Studios, in collaboration with Dadi Films and Youman Cartoon. Tea Pets had its world premiere at the 2017 Seattle International Film Festival on 20 May 2017, and was released in Chinese cinemas on 21 July 2017. It grossed $5,057,715 at the worldwide box office.

Premise 
The plot concerns a group of ceramic tea pets who live in a tea shop, taking pride in changing colour when tea is poured near them. However, Ah Tang is the only tea pet who will not change color no matter how the tea is poured. One day, Xiaolai, a magical robot from the future, accidentally crashes into the tea shop. Ah Tang sees this as a glimmer of hope to find find a way to make his color beautiful. So, Ah Tang convinces Xiaolai to on an adventurous journey with him to find the future and try to find Ah Tang's colour.

Release 
Tea Pets had its world premiere at the 2017 Seattle International Film Festival on 20 May 2017 as one of ten Chinese feature films that premiered as part of the second China Stars Showcase series. It premiered in China on 16 July, before being released in cinemas nationwide on 21 July. In China, it grossed $4,552,351, and was later released in several other countries, ending with a worldwide box office gross of $5,057,715.

References

External links 

Chinese computer-animated films
Chinese children's films
Chinese comedy films